Aversion therapy is a form of psychological treatment in which the patient is exposed to a stimulus while simultaneously being subjected to some form of discomfort. This conditioning is intended to cause the patient to associate the stimulus with unpleasant sensations with the intention of quelling the targeted (sometimes compulsive) behavior.

Aversion therapies can take many forms, for example: placing unpleasant-tasting substances on the fingernails to discourage nail-chewing; pairing the use of an emetic with the experience of alcohol; or pairing behavior with electric shocks of mild to higher intensities.

Aversion therapy, when used in a nonconsensual manner, is widely considered to be inhumane. At the Judge Rotenberg Educational Center, aversion therapy is used to perform behavior modification in students as part of the center's applied behavioral analysis program. The center has been condemned by the United Nations for torture.

In addictions
Various forms of aversion therapy have been used in the treatment of addiction to alcohol and other drugs since 1932 (discussed in Principles of Addiction Medicine, Chapter 8, published by the American Society of Addiction Medicine in 2003).

Alcohol addiction
An approach to the treatment of alcohol dependence that has been wrongly characterized as aversion therapy involves the use of disulfiram, a drug which is sometimes used as a second-line treatment under appropriate medical supervision. When a person drinks even a small amount of alcohol, disulfiram causes sensitivity involving highly unpleasant reactions, which can be clinically severe. Rather than as an actual aversion therapy, the nastiness of the disulfiram-alcohol reaction is deployed as a drinking deterrent for people receiving other forms of therapy who actively wish to be kept in a state of enforced sobriety (disulfiram is not administered to active drinkers).

Cocaine dependency
Emetic (to induce vomiting) therapy and faradic (administered shock) aversion therapy have been used to induce aversion for cocaine dependency.

Cigarette addiction
It is unknown whether aversion therapy, in the form of rapid smoking (to provide an unpleasant stimulus), can help tobacco smokers overcome the urge to smoke.

In compulsive habits
Aversion therapy has been used in the context of subconscious or compulsive habits, such as chronic nailbiting, hair-pulling (trichotillomania), or skin-picking (commonly associated with forms of obsessive compulsive disorder as well as trichotillomania).

In history 
Pliny the Elder attempted to heal alcoholism in the first century Rome by putting putrid spiders in alcohol abusers' drinking glasses.

In 1935, Charles Shadel turned a colonial mansion in Seattle into the Shadel Sanatorium where he began treating alcoholics for their substance use disorder. His enterprise was launched with the help of gastroenterologist Walter Voegtlin and psychiatrist Fred Lemere. Together, they created a medical practice that exclusively treated chronic alcoholism through Pavlovian conditioned reflex aversion therapy.

In the 1960s and 1970s aversion therapy was used on a small group of lesbian and bisexual identifying women in England. Electric shocks and injections to induce vomiting were used to prevent the woman from looking at other women. This was meant to work as a form of conversion therapy.

In popular culture
 In Anthony Burgess's novel A Clockwork Orange and the film adaptation directed by Stanley Kubrick, the main character Alex is subjected to a fictional form of aversion therapy, called the "Ludovico technique", with the aim of stopping his violent behavior.
 Aversion therapy plays a major role in the King of the Hill episode Keeping up with the Joneses, where one of the characters is forced to smoke an entire carton of cigarettes to discourage them from smoking, only for this tactic to backfire and worsen addiction.

Judge Rotenberg Center 
The Judge Rotenberg Center is a school in Canton, Massachusetts that uses the methods of ABA to perform behavior modification in children with developmental disabilities. Before it was banned in 2020, the center used a device called a Graduated Electronic Decelerator (GED) to deliver electric skin shocks as aversives. The Judge Rotenberg  Center has been condemned by the United Nations for torture as a result of this practice. While many human rights and disability rights advocates have campaigned to shut down the center, as of 2020 it remains open. Six students have died of preventable incidents at the school since it opened in 1971.

See also 
 Behavior modification

References 

Treatment of mental disorders
Behaviorism
Sexual orientation change efforts
Psychiatry controversies